Nikolai Sinebrychoff (Nikolai Petrovich Sinebryukhov) (born ca. 1789 in Gavrilov Posad, Empire of Russia - died 23 January 1848 in Tver, Empire of Russia) was a Russian businessman settled in Finland, who founded the Sinebrychoff brewery in 1809. He belonged to the Sinebrychoff family which had a long history in Finland.

Life
Petr Sinebrychoff, father of Nikolai Sinebrychoff, was originally a poor tenant farmer, who moved to Kymi in Old Finland in the late 1790s and founded a brewery to serve the Ruotsinsalmi sea fortress. As his eldest son, Nikolai Sinebrychoff became the director of the brewery at age 16, when Petr Sinebrychoff died in 1805. The family business soon expanded to other areas. After the Finnish War, Sinebrychoff moved the business activity from Ruotsinsalmi, which had become insignificant, to Suomenlinna (then known as Viapori) near the city of Helsinki. He was one of the official food merchants for the Russian garrison. In 1816 he won the right to sell spirits, beer, small beer and sima to the Viapori soldiers, who had a great demand for them. He also sold food to the garrison in five shops and soon became rich.

In 1817 Sinebrychoff bought the lot of an old spirits factory in Ullanlinna, Helsinki and acquired the right to manufacture and sell spirits, which he then regularly renewed up to his death. After buying a brewery in Vanhakaupunki he acquired a monopoly for brewery activities in Helsinki in 1819. In the same year, he received permission to build a brewery on the lot south of Hietalahdentori. However, the activity was only moved there from Ullanlinna in 1829 when the new premises were completed. In 1842 a luxurious new main building was built in the brewery area, which currently houses the Sinebrychoff Art Museum. In 1836, Sinebrychoff bought a three-hectare lot near the brewery, creating the Sinebrychoff park. Sinebrychoff himself never moved to Helsinki, but instead lived in the house he had commissioned for himself in Viapori, which was later dismantled. He never learned either Swedish or Finnish but always conducted his business in Russian.

Sinebrychoff was also a significant renovator in Helsinki. By request from the state, he commissioned the Turku barracks in Kamppi from 1830 to 1833. Sinebrychoff was awarded the title of commercial official in 1835. His business eventually expanded also to abroad. He died in 1848 of pneumonia on a business trip to Tver.

Legacy

Nikolai Sinebrychoff never married or had children. After his death, his younger brothers Ivan and Pavel Sinebrychoff became the directors of the brewery, later joined by Pavel's children Nicolas and Paul Sinebrychoff, who also received the title of commercial official. The family grave is located at the Helsinki Orthodox cemetery.

In 1988 the Sinebrychoff brewery introduced the Nikolai Sinebrychoff beer to honour its founder.

References

19th-century businesspeople from the Russian Empire
19th-century Finnish businesspeople
Finnish people of Russian descent
1780s births
1848 deaths
People from Suzdalsky Uyezd